Faison Historic District is a national historic district located at Faison, Duplin County, North Carolina. The district encompasses 116 contributing buildings, 2 contributing structures, and 1 contributing object in the central business district and surrounding residential area of Faison. It includes industrial, residential, and commercial buildings with notable examples of Greek Revival, Queen Anne, and Italianate style architecture.  Notable buildings include the Cates Pickle Company (1931), Moore Lee Thornton Store (c. 1850-1870), C. S. Hines Store (c. 1900), Clifton's Service Station (1933), The Walter Livingston Hicks House (C. 1880), Faison Pharmacy, Witherington Building (1915), Faison Depot (1888), Presbyterian Church (1918), Elias Faison House (c. 1850), Faison-Williams House (1853), and Witherington House (1880).

It was added to the National Register of Historic Places in 1997.

References

Historic districts on the National Register of Historic Places in North Carolina
Greek Revival architecture in North Carolina
Italianate architecture in North Carolina
Queen Anne architecture in North Carolina
Buildings and structures in Duplin County, North Carolina
National Register of Historic Places in Duplin County, North Carolina
1997 establishments in North Carolina